Michael Thomas Schmitz (born December 14, 1974) is an American Roman Catholic priest, speaker, author, and podcaster. 

The Director of Youth and Young Adult Ministries in the Diocese of Duluth, Minnesota, Schmitz is most notable for his social media presence, which mainly consist of his YouTube videos and The Bible in a Year podcast, both of which are produced by Catholic publisher Ascension Press. Schmitz is a nationally renowned public speaker and makes speeches at Catholic events such as the Fellowship of Catholic University Students leadership summit, Steubenville Youth Conferences, and the Good News Conference.

Biography 
Mike Schmitz is the fourth of six children, born to Peter Schmitz, an orthopedic surgeon, and Gudrun "Goodie" Schmitz (née Amundsen). Schmitz was born in Oakland, a Chicago neighborhood where his father attended medical school. The family then relocated to Brainerd, Minnesota, where his father practiced medicine. Schmitz is of Irish and German descent, his paternal grandmother comes from County Cork. Schmitz was baptised on the 1st March 1975 at the Church of the Assumption, Richmond, Minneapolis. He attended St Francis of the Lakes Catholic School for elementary school, Brainerd High School, and St John's University, where he majored in Theology.

Despite being brought up in a Catholic family, Schmitz was largely indifferent to religion until an encounter with Christ through Confession at the age of 15.  According to Schmitz, this encounter "led me down the road to asking God what He wants". After spending time as a missionary in South America, Schmitz attended Saint Paul Seminary School of Divinity and was ordained in 2003 for the Diocese of Duluth. Schmitz is currently the director of youth and young adult ministry for the dioceseas well as the Newman Center chaplain at the University of Minnesota Duluth. 

In a Steubenville Youth Conference presentation in 2015, and later in his book, Made for Love: Same-Sex Attraction and the Catholic Church, published in 2018, Schmitz alludes to having a sibling who may be gay.

Projects 

Since 2015, Schmitz has been the host of Ascension Presents, a YouTube series produced by Ascension Press offering Catholic perspectives on cultural societal issues. Schmitz's videos have covered topics from mixed martial arts to Batman v Superman. Beginning in 2017, these talks have also been offered as podcasts.

On January 1, 2021, Schmitz and Ascension launched a new podcast, The Bible in a Year, which consists of 365 daily episodes in which he reads and discusses sections of the Bible and adds his own commentary and prayer. Even before it launched, it had become the number-one ranked podcast on Apple Podcasts.

Schmitz was the keynote speaker at the 2022 March for Life rally,an annual pro-life event in Washington, DC. He used his speech to tell the story of his maternal grandmother, Helen Amundsen, a senior nurse who conscientiously objected when the hospital she worked at decided to perform abortions after Roe v. Wade was passed in 1973.   

On June 29, 2022, Schmitz and Ascension announced they would be launching another podcast, The Catechism in a Year, which premiered on January 1, 2023. The format is similar to The Bible in a Year, consisting of 365 daily episodes where Schmitz reads and discusses sections of the Catechism, adding in his own prayer and commentary.

Books 

 Made for Love: Same-Sex Attraction and the Catholic Church (2018)
 How to Make Great Decisions (2019)
 Pocket Guide to the Sacrament of Reconciliation (2021)

See also 

 Bishop Robert Barron
 Catholic Church in the United States

References

External links 

 Talks by Fr. Michael Schmitz at Lighthouse Catholic Media
 About Fr. Mike Schmitz at UMD Newman
 Ascension Presents Youtube Channel
 Twitter - frmikeschmitz 
 Instagram - fathermikeschmitz 
 Ascension Press 

Living people
1974 births
American people of Irish descent
American people of German descent
21st-century American Roman Catholic priests
Roman Catholic Diocese of Duluth
American podcasters
American YouTubers
Writers from Duluth, Minnesota